Mookda Narinrak  (มุกดา นรินทร์รักษ์; born 1996) or known as Mook (มุก) is an actress, model and dancer in Thailand. She is mostly known for her roles in Mussaya (2017), Suparburuth Jom Jorn (2019), So Wayree (2020) and Ku Kaen Saen Ruk (2021). She is the winner of Miss Teen Thailand 2011.

Early life
Mookda Narinrak is born on 26 July 1996 in Ranong province, Thailand. She went to Pichai Ratana Carmi Secondary School for her high school education. She also attended University of the Thai Chamber of Commerce (UTCC) majoring in Communication Arts.

Career
She competed in Miss Teen Thailand in 2011 and she was the winner for that year. She also participated in another show that is TO BE NUMBER ONE IDOL 2012 CONTEST and won for dance team category. Other than that she also working as a model for Japan Magazine Ray from 2013 to 2014, where she worked both in Bangkok and Tokyo as a professional runway model. In 2016, she signed a contract with Channel 7 to become one of the actresses. Her debut drama was in Kamin Gub Poon, where she is paired with Bank Arthit Tangwiboonpanit.

Filmography

Film

Television series

Music video appearances

FilmographyMC
Television 
 20 : ทุกวัน เวลา น.-น. ทางช่อง ร่วมกับ

Online 
 2018 : Ep.1 ฮาน่า มุกดา พลอย On Air YouTube:PHM Channel ร่วมกับ Hana Lewis, Randapa Muntalumpa

Awards and nominations

References

External links
 Mookda Narinrak on Channel 7
 
 

1996 births
Living people
Mookda Narinrak
Mookda Narinrak
Mookda Narinrak
Mookda Narinrak
Thai television personalities
Mookda Narinrak